Stipe Bačelić-Grgić (born 16 February 1988 in Šibenik) is a Croatian professional footballer who plays as a midfielder for Croatia Zmijavci.

Club career
A product of HNK Hajduk Split youth academy, Bačelić-Grgić was promoted to the squad in July 2006, but failed to break into the first team and earn any appearances the following season. He spent the next three years on loans spells at HNK Šibenik, HNK Trogir and NK Međimurje. Upon the end of his last loan at Međimurje he was released by Hajduk in June 2009 and joined his hometown club Šibenik the following month on a free transfer. In December 2011, he terminated his contract with Šibenik through arbitration. In January 2012, Bačelić-Grgić signed a two-and-a-half-year contract with Istra 1961.

International career
Bačelić-Grgić was also capped a total of 25 times and scored 10 goals for Croatia's U-16, U-17 and U-19 teams between 2003 and 2006, and was a regular member of the squad which won fourth place at the 2005 European Under-17 Championship.

References

External links

1988 births
Living people
Sportspeople from Šibenik
Association football midfielders
Croatian footballers
Croatia youth international footballers
HNK Hajduk Split players
HNK Šibenik players
HNK Trogir players
NK Međimurje players
NK Istra 1961 players
NK Hrvatski Dragovoljac players
Cercle Brugge K.S.V. players
Puskás Akadémia FC players
Mezőkövesdi SE footballers
NK Slaven Belupo players
Croatian Football League players
Belgian Pro League players
Nemzeti Bajnokság I players
Croatian expatriate footballers
Expatriate footballers in Belgium
Croatian expatriate sportspeople in Belgium
Expatriate footballers in Hungary
Croatian expatriate sportspeople in Hungary